Harry Sven-Olof Bild (born 18 December 1936) is a Swedish former professional footballer who played as a striker.

Club career
Born in Växjö he was transferred to IFK Norrköping during the 1950s. He turned professional for FC Zürich in Switzerland and for Feyenoord in the Netherlands, scoring 39 goals in 52 games. He turned back to Östers IF in 1967 and won the Swedish national title in 1968. Between 1968 and 1973, he scored 42 goals in 113 matches for Östers.

International career 
Bild made 28 appearances and scored 13 goals for the national football team of Sweden and he won Guldbollen in 1963.

References

External links

 
 
 
 

1936 births
Living people
Association football forwards
Swedish footballers
Sweden international footballers
Östers IF players
IFK Norrköping players
Feyenoord players
FC Zürich players
Allsvenskan players
Eredivisie players
Expatriate footballers in Switzerland
Expatriate footballers in the Netherlands
Swedish expatriate sportspeople in the Netherlands
Swedish expatriate sportspeople in Switzerland
Swedish expatriate footballers
People from Växjö
Sportspeople from Kronoberg County